A dental school (school of dental medicine, school of dentistry, dental college) is a tertiary educational institution—or part of such an institution—that teaches dental medicine to prospective dentists and potentially other dental auxiliaries. Dental school graduates receive a degree in Dentistry, Dental Surgery, or Dental Medicine, which, depending upon the jurisdiction, might be a bachelor's degree, master's degree, a professional degree, or a doctorate. Schools can also offer postgraduate training in general dentistry, and/or training in endodontics, oral and maxillofacial surgery, oral pathology, oral and maxillofacial radiology, orthodontics, pedodontics, periodontics, prosthodontics, dental public health, restorative dentistry, as well as postgraduate training for dental hygienists and dental technicians.

Other oral health professionals including dental hygienists, dental technicians and denturists, dental therapists and oral health therapists, Dental assistants or dental nurses, and other members of the dental auxiliary including orthodontic auxiliaries may be trained at dental schools, or at universities of applied science or polytechnics.

Sometimes dental education is done within medical schools, as in Pakistan; the separation between medical and dental educations is also blurred within certain sub-specialties, such as oral and maxillofacial surgery.

List of dental schools

List of dental colleges in India
List of dental schools in Australia
List of dental schools in Bangladesh
List of dental schools in Israel 
List of dental schools in Pakistan
List of dental schools in the United Kingdom
List of dental schools in the United States
List of dental colleges in South Korea

See also

 Dentistry throughout the world
 Dental degree
 American Student Dental Association

 
Types of university or college